Marcel Schumann (15 January 1901 – 23 April 1989) was a Luxembourgian footballer. He competed in the men's tournament at the 1924 Summer Olympics.

References

External links

1901 births
1989 deaths
Luxembourgian footballers
Luxembourg international footballers
Olympic footballers of Luxembourg
Footballers at the 1924 Summer Olympics
Sportspeople from Luxembourg City
Association football defenders
CA Spora Luxembourg players